The white-bellied worm snake (Myriopholis albiventer) is a species of snake in the family Leptotyphlopidae.

References

Myriopholis
Reptiles described in 1995